The Magdalena Peninsula is a 69-acre (28 hectare) peninsula located near the entrance to the Bay of Santander in the city of Santander, Cantabria, along the north coast of Spain. 

The peninsula is a popular recreational destination for both tourists and locals. The historic Palacio de la Magdalena is located on the peninsula, which along with its surrounding gardens, is designated as a cultural heritage site. Also located on the peninsula is a small zoo, three galleons of the Cantabrian mariner Vital Alsar Ramírez, two beaches and a lighthouse.

References

Peninsulas of Spain
Landforms of Cantabria